Najeeba Khan Zeenat is an Indian politician and a member of the Sixteenth Legislative Assembly of Uttar Pradesh in India. She represented the Patiyali constituency of Uttar Pradesh and is a member of the Samajwadi Party.

Early life and  education
Najeeva Khan Zeenat was born in Kasganj district. She holds a Bachelor's degree (alma mater not known).

Political  career
Najeeva Khan Zeenat has been a MLA for one term. She represented the Patiyali constituency and is a member of the Samajwadi Party political party.

Posts held

See also

 Patiyali (Assembly constituency)
 Sixteenth Legislative Assembly of Uttar Pradesh
 Uttar Pradesh Legislative Assembly

References 

Women in Uttar Pradesh politics
Samajwadi Party politicians
Uttar Pradesh MLAs 2012–2017
People from Kasganj district
1962 births
Living people
21st-century Indian women politicians
21st-century Indian politicians